Stadio Nereo Rocco is a football stadium in Trieste, Italy. It is currently the home of Triestina, named after former player and manager Nereo Rocco. The stadium holds 21,000.

Cagliari played their final home games of the 2011–12 Serie A season at the ground, due to restoration of their Stadio Sant'Elia.

References

Venue
Nereo Rocco
Buildings and structures in Trieste
Sports venues in Friuli-Venezia Giulia